LKPS Lublin, officially known for sponsorship reasons as LUK Lublin, is a professional men's volleyball club based in Lublin in eastern Poland, founded in 2013. The club has been promoted to the top flight of the Polish volleyball, PlusLiga in 2021.

Club history
The foundation of the club took place on 26 August 2013 in the city of Lublin as a sports association under the name LKPS Lublin. Lublin began its history in the 3rd Polish Volleyball League, playing there from the club foundation in 2013 until 2015.

From 2015 to 2019, Lublin was playing in the 2nd Polish Volleyball League. In 2019, the team coached by Maciej Kołodziejczyk finished the league in 2nd place, and won promotion to the 1st Polish Volleyball League.

In 2021, acting as LUK Politechnika Lublin, the team won the league and therefore gained the possibility to play in the upcoming PlusLiga season.

Team
As of 2022–23 season

Coaching staff
Players

Former names

See also

References

External links
 Official website 
 Team profile at PlusLiga.pl 
 Team profile at Volleybox.net

Polish volleyball clubs
Sport in Lublin
Volleyball clubs established in 2013
2013 establishments in Poland